Musicforthemorningafter is the debut album by Pete Yorn, released on March 27, 2001, through Columbia Records.

Reception 

The album was well received by critics. MacKenzie Wilson of AllMusic wrote, "The year 2001 belonged to Yorn, and his critical praise was not unwarranted, with Musicforthemorningafter marking the stunning beginning of a long, varied career." 
Rolling Stone included the album twice in their Critics' Top Albums of 2001. Steven Chean called it "Folk-rock that actually rocks."

Track listing

Expanded edition with bonus tracks

Personnel 

 Pete Yorn - vocals (all tracks), acoustic guitar (1-8, 10-13), electric guitar (1-4, 6-7, 10, 12), baritone guitar (11), drums (1-4, 6-13), bass (1, 3-4, 6-7, 10), piano (5, 8), analog synth (5), synth strings (1, 9), casio keyboard (7), percussion (2, 10), tambourine (6-7), finger cymbals (11), e-bow (11), all instruments (14)
 Brad Wood - producer
 R. Walt Vincent - producer
 Ken Andrews - producer
 Don Fleming - producer

 The song "Just Another" was featured in a season 1 episode of Veronica Mars, "Ruskie Business".

Charts

Weekly charts

Certifications

References 

2001 debut albums
Pete Yorn albums
Albums produced by Brad Wood
Albums produced by Don Fleming (musician)
Columbia Records albums